The Blind Watchmaker is a documentary where Richard Dawkins challenges William Paley's theories on creationism and takes on Paley's descendants. It was produced in 1987 by Jeremy Taylor and Richard Dawkins for BBC Horizon series and won the Sci-Tech Award for Best Science Documentary of the year. It was based on a book of the same name written by Dawkins in 1986.

References

1987 films
British documentary films
Genetics in the United Kingdom
Horizon (British TV series)
Films based on non-fiction books
Works about genetics
Documentary television shows about evolution
1980s British films